The name Elsa has been used for two tropical cyclones worldwide, one each in the Atlantic Ocean and the South-West Indian Ocean, along with one extratropical European windstorm.

In the Atlantic:
 Hurricane Elsa (2021), formed in the eastern Caribbean Sea, the earliest fifth named storm in the Atlantic; twice became a minimal hurricane, though made landfall in Cuba and later in Florida and then in Rhode Island, each while at tropical storm intensity.

In the South-West Indian:
 Cyclone Elsa (1975), affected Madagascar and Mozambique but no damage was reported.

In Europe:
 Storm Elsa (2019), caused substantial damage in southern Europe and at least eight fatalities were reported.

See also 

Similar names which have also been used for tropical cyclones:
 Tropical Storm Elsie
 Tropical Storm Ilsa

Atlantic hurricane set index articles
South-West Indian Ocean cyclone set index articles